National Democrats (Germany)
 National Democrats (Northern Ireland) (1965–1970)
 National Democrats (Norway, 1991)
 National Democrats (Norway) (2006–2007)
 National Democrats (Poland) (1886–1947)
 National Democrats (Sweden) (2001–2014)
 National Democrats (United Kingdom) (1995–2011)

See also
 National Democratic Movement (disambiguation)
 National Democratic Party (disambiguation)
 Democratic National Party (disambiguation)
 National Democracy (disambiguation)